Song Wenjie (born 15 January 1991) is a Chinese professional footballer who plays for Chinese Super League club Guangzhou City.

Club career
Song Wenjie joined Qingdao Hailifeng's youth academy in 2002. In February 2010, Qingdao Hailifeng was engaged in bribery and private business dealings in matches held from 2007 to 2009 and was banned from all future league matches. Song and his teammates became unattached players without a club. After being released, he signed a contract with Chinese Super League side Qingdao Jonoon in March 2010 after a successful trial with the club.

Song was promoted to Qingdao Jonoon's first team in the summer of 2010 and made his senior debut on 31 October 2010 in a 0–0 away draw against Shanghai Shenhua. Song was given further more opportunities to play for the senior team during the 2011 league season after then manager Chang Woe-Ryong took charge of the team. On 8 May 2011, he scored his first two senior goals in a 4–1 home win against Nanchang Hengyuan. Song scored six goals in nineteen appearances and won the Chinese Football Association Young Player of the Year award at the end of the 2011 season.

On 27 February 2015, Song transfer to China League One side Hebei China Fortune. He made his debut for the club on 14 March 2015 in a 1–0 home loss against Beijing Institute of Technology. On 15 April 2015, he scored his first goal in a 2–0 away win against Guangxi Longguida in the 2015 Chinese FA Cup. On 25 April 2015, Song scored his first league goal, earned a penalty and assisted once in a league match against Tianjin Songjiang, which ensured Hebei's 3–2 win. On 21 July 2015, he suffered a rupture of cruciate ligament in his right knee in a league match against Harbin Yiteng, which ruling him out of the field for the rest of the season.
Song, who was recovering from injury, was named in Hebei China Fortune's reserves squad in the 2016 season. He returned to the first team squad in July 2017. He made his return on 24 September 2017 in a 0–0 away draw against Changchun Yatai, coming on as a substitute for Zhang Lifeng in the 71st minute.

In February 2019, Song transferred to Chinese Super League side Shandong Luneng.

Career statistics 
Statistics accurate as of match played 4 January 2022.

Honours

Individual
 Chinese Football Association Young Player of the Year: 2011

References

External links

1991 births
Living people
Association football forwards
Chinese footballers
Footballers from Qingdao
Qingdao Hainiu F.C. (1990) players
Hebei F.C. players
Shandong Taishan F.C. players
Guangzhou City F.C. players
Chinese Super League players
China League One players